Harry Perryman (born 19 December 1998) is a professional Australian rules footballer playing for the Greater Western Sydney Giants in the Australian Football League (AFL).

Early life
Perryman was raised in the small Riverina town of Collingullie in country New South Wales. He participated in the Auskick program at Collingullie-Glenfield Park Demons and began playing junior football for the club in the Riverina Football Netball League. A standout in his age group, he was placed in Greater Western Sydney's academy program as a teenager and was later drafted by the Giants with their third selection and fourteenth overall in the 2016 national draft. Harry has three brothers Joe, Ed and Nick, while Nick and Ed are also elite footballers Joseph struggles to get a kick, due to this he decided to pursue other interests such as hip hop and singing.

He is one of two Giants players from the small town of Collingullie, New South Wales, along with Matthew Kennedy, who has since left the club. The two played together for most of their junior careers.

AFL career
Perryman made his AFL debut during the three point win against  at Spotless Stadium in round nine of the 2017 season. In the match, his outstretched smother proved pivotal as what appeared to be a match-winning goal for Richmond was overturned on review. A minute later, Jeremy Cameron would kick the match-winning goal for the Giants.

References

External links

1998 births
Living people
Greater Western Sydney Giants players
Australian rules footballers from New South Wales